American Peak is a  mountain summit located in Hinsdale County, of southwest Colorado, United States. It is situated 11 miles northeast of the community of Silverton, on land managed by the Bureau of Land Management. It is part of the San Juan Mountains which is a subset of the Rocky Mountains, and is situated four miles west of the Continental Divide. Neighbors include Handies Peak one mile to the north-northeast, and Jones Mountain, 0.8 mile to the west-southwest. The mountain's name was officially adopted in 2005 by the United States Board on Geographic Names to recognize the American spirit and heritage, and the summit's proximity to American Basin.

Climate 
According to the Köppen climate classification system, American Peak is located in an alpine subarctic climate zone with cold, snowy winters, and cool to warm summers. Due to its altitude, it receives precipitation all year, as snow in winter, and as thunderstorms in summer, with a dry period in late spring. Precipitation runoff from the mountain drains into tributaries of the Gunnison River.

Gallery

See also

References

External links 
 Weather forecast: American Peak

Mountains of Hinsdale County, Colorado
San Juan Mountains (Colorado)
Mountains of Colorado
North American 4000 m summits